Atlanta Rhythm Section (ARS) is an American Southern rock band from Doraville, Georgia. Formed in the summer of 1971, the group originally featured vocalist Rodney Justo, guitarist Barry Bailey, bassist Paul Goddard, keyboardist Dean Daughtry and drummer Robert Nix. The band's current lineup includes Daughtry alongside Justo (who most recently rejoined in 2011), guitarist Steve "Clean" Stone (since 1986), bassist Justin Senker (from 1992 to 2011, and since 2014), guitarist David Anderson (since 2007) and drummer Rodger Stephan (since 2016).

History

1971–1983
ARS was originally conceived by producer and songwriter Buddy Buie as the house band of Studio One, a recording studio in Doraville. The group signed with Decca Records and began recording its own material in August 1971, before recording its self-titled debut album in November. By the time the album was released in January 1972, James "J. R." Cobb had joined on rhythm guitar. After touring for a few months, Justo left ARS to move to New York, dissatisfied with the album's reception. He was replaced by Ronnie Hammond. With its new lineup, the group released seven albums over the course of seven years – Back Up Against the Wall in 1973, Third Annual Pipe Dream in 1974, Dog Days in 1975, Red Tape and A Rock and Roll Alternative in 1976, Champagne Jam in 1978, and Underdog in 1979.

The band's next lineup change came when Nix left the band in 1979, "right after Underdog", due to creative differences. He was replaced by Roy Yeager, who had most recently toured with Lobo. Are You Ready!, a collection of live and studio recordings, was released shortly after Yeager's arrival, although Nix claimed he performed on some of the album's tracks. The Boys from Doraville and Quinella followed in 1980 and 1981. The band recorded a new album in 1982, however due to "creative differences" with CBS Records it was unreleased; shortly thereafter, Yeager was replaced by Danny Biget. The next January, Hammond also left to pursue a solo career. Justo subsequently returned on a part-time basis. At the end of 1983, founding member Goddard announced his departure from ARS.

1984–2006
In early 1984, ARS was joined by new vocalist Andy Anderson, bassist Tommy Stribling and drummer Keith Hamrick. Stribling was replaced by Steve Stone in early 1986. By the beginning of 1987, the group had been joined by new vocalist Shaun Williamson, a returning Stribling in place of J. R. Cobb, and new drummer Sean Burke. Around a year later, Ronnie Hammond returned, Brendan O'Brien replaced Stribling, and J.E. Garnett took over from Stone. By the end of 1988, Stone had returned on guitar. This lineup released Truth in a Structured Form in October 1989.

Justin Senker replaced Garnett in 1992, and the new lineup issued Atlanta Rhythm Section '96 in 1996. Ray "R.J." Vealey took over from Burke in 1995, who debuted on the 1997 album of re-recorded material Partly Plugged. This was followed two years later by Eufaula, the band's first album of new material in ten years. During the subsequent tour, Vealey died suddenly of a heart attack on November 13, 1999, which was later deemed to be as the result of "chronic cocaine abuse". He was replaced by Jim Keeling and the group returned to touring in early 2000. In early 2001, Andy Anderson returned when Hammond joined the Voices of Classic Rock touring group. The new lineup toured for five years but did not record, only releasing the 2005 live album Live at Stabler Arena.

Since 2006
In early 2006, founding member Barry Bailey left Atlanta Rhythm Section, with Alan Accardi taking his place. The following year, Accardi was replaced by David Anderson. Andy Anderson was temporarily replaced for tour dates in the spring of 2008, after suffering a heart attack for which he required triple bypass surgery; a friend of his, Steve Croson, took over for a couple of shows, followed later by former members Rodney Justo and Shaun Williamson. In 2011, ARS released With All Due Respect which was dedicated to Ronnie Hammond, who died in March that year.

Shortly after the release of With All Due Respect, founding members Justo and Paul Goddard (both of whom made guest appearances on the album) rejoined the group for the first time since 1983. The band continued touring until April 2014, when Goddard died of cancer. Justin Senker returned to take his place later in the year. Rodger Stephan replaced Jim Keeling in 2016.  At the beginning of 2020, Lee Shealy replaced the band's last constant member, Dean Daughtry, who retired in December 2019.

Members

Current

Former

Timeline

Lineups

References

External links
Atlanta Rhythm Section official website

Atlanta Rhythm Section